is Toei's twenty-seventh production of the Super Sentai metaseries, and the first series to use TV Asahi's current logo. It aired from February 16, 2003 to February 8, 2004, replacing Ninpuu Sentai Hurricaneger and was replaced by Tokusou Sentai Dekaranger. The program was part of TV Asahi's 2003 Super Hero Time block with Kamen Rider 555. The series is based on dinosaurs and explosions. Its action footage was used in Power Rangers Dino Thunder. In addition, episode 10 in nearly its entirety was used for episode 19 of Power Rangers Dino Thunder as an English-dubbed show that the initial three Dino Thunder Power Rangers discover on television.

The cast members from the series reprised their roles for the 2014 film, Zyuden Sentai Kyoryuger vs. Go-Busters: The Great Dinosaur Battle! Farewell Our Eternal Friends.

Shout! Factory released the series on Region 1 DVD on November 8, 2022.

Plot
Scientists believe that 65,000,000 years ago, a meteorite's crash on Earth killed off the dinosaurs. In truth, it split Earth into two parallel universes called . Dino Earth is an Earth where dinosaurs were still the superior species. They were at war with the Evoliens, entities that emerged from the meteor. The two Earths are separate until Asuka, one of the Saurians from Dino Earth, arrives on Earth via a trans-dimensional portal. However, he is followed by the Evoliens in their Anamolicarus spaceship and the three Bakuryū under their control. As the Bakuryū Tyrannosaurus, Ptreranodon, and Triceratops attack Tokyo, a call is sent out to three destined ones who possess  to gain the power to tame the three beasts. Together with their Bakuryū partners, the three become Abarangers to protect their dimension from the Evoliens. In time, another Abaranger appears, takes the name , and fights the others while the Evoliens carry out their ultimate goal: the resurrection of their god.

Characters

Episodes
All episode titles contain the phrase . On 5 October 2003 (the day that episode 32 aired) the show used TV Asahi's current logo.

Film
 is a 2003 film, which takes place between episodes 21 and 22 and was written by Naruhisa Arakawa and directed by Satoshi Morota.

V-Cinema
: A 2004 V-Cinema release, which takes place between episodes 40 and 41 and was written by Atsushi Maekawa and directed by Katsuya Watanabe.
: A 2005 V-Cinema release, which takes place between episodes 31 and 32 of Tokusou Sentai Dekaranger and was written by Naruhisa Arakawa and directed by Taro Sakamoto.
: A 2007 V-Cinema release, which takes place between episodes 42 and 43 of GoGo Sentai Boukenger and was written by Akatsuki Yamatoya and directed by Katsuya Watanabe.
: An upcoming 2023 V-Cinema release, which takes place after the final episode of the series and will be written by Naruhisa Arakawa and directed by Hisashi Kimura.

Specials
: A 2003 Kodansha Super Video special.
: An upcoming 2023 Toei Tokusatsu Fan Club-exclusive special.

Production
The trademark for the series was filed by Toei Company on 17 October 2002.

Cast
: 
: 
: 
: 
: 
/Princess Sakihime (12 & 13)/Angel (36): 
/Tetsunosuke Sugishita (12 & 13)/God (36): 
: 
: 
/: 
: 
/: 
/:

Voice actors
: 
: 
: 
: 
: 
: 
: 
: 
: 
: 
///: 
: 
: 
:

Movie and VS Series guest actors
: 
: 
: 
: 
:

Songs
Opening theme

Lyrics: Yumi Yoshimoto
Composition: Takafumi Iwasaki
Arrangement: Seiichi Kyōda
Artist: Masaaki Endoh

Ending theme

Lyrics: Yumi Yoshimoto
Composition: Yasuo Kosugi
Arrangement: Seiichi Kyōda
Artist: Akira Kushida

International Broadcasts and Home Video
The series was limited to only airing in Asian regions outside of Japan, as most international regions have aired the Power Rangers adaptation, Power Rangers Dino Thunder instead.
In South Korea, the series was dubbed in Korean and aired on July 2004 on Tooniverse under Power Rangers Dino Thunder (파워레인저 다이노썬더) which is the exact same title as the Power Rangers adaptation that it was given.
In Thailand, the series was given a Thai dub. Rose Media Entertainment (formerly Rose Video) used to air on iTV, first premiering on 2005. It was also released on home video.
In the Chinese-speaking world, Both Mandarin (Taiwan dialect) and Cantonese dubs were produced and aired in Taiwan and Hong Kong respectively.
In Taiwan, the series aired with a Taiwanese Mandarin dub on October 30, 2005, until October 8, 2006 with all episodes dubbed, airing on GTV.
In Hong Kong, the series aired with a Cantonese Chinese dub on March 19, 2006 (a few months after Taiwan aired the Taiwanese Mandarin dub) on TVB Jade until March 4, 2007 with all episodes dubbed.
In North America, the series would receive a DVD release by Shout! Factory on November 8, 2022 in the original Japanese audio with English subtitles.

Notes

References

External links
 
 
 at Super-Sentai.net 
 for Bakuryū Sentai Abaranger 20th: The Unforgivable Abare 

Super Sentai
Prehistoric people in popular culture
Television series about dinosaurs
2003 Japanese television series debuts
2004 Japanese television series endings
Japanese action television series
Japanese fantasy television series
Japanese science fiction television series